Triraphis is a genus of African, Arabian, Australian, and Brazilian plants in the grass family. Needlegrass is a common name for plants in this genus.

 Species
 Triraphis andropogonoides (Steud.) E.Phillips, - South Africa, Botswana, Namibia, Lesotho
 Triraphis compacta Cope, - Ethiopia
 Triraphis devia Filg. & Zuloaga, - State of Goiás in Brazil	
 Triraphis mollis R.Br., - Australia (Northern Territory plus all states except Tasmania); naturalized in Britain, Belgium, Texas
 Triraphis pumilio R.Br., - Angola, Namibia, Sahara, Arabian Pen
 Triraphis purpurea Hack., - Angola, Namibia, South Africa, Botswana
 Triraphis ramosissima Hack., - Angola, Namibia, South Africa
 Triraphis schinzii Hack.,  Tanzania, Mozambique, Zambia, Zimbabwe, Angola, Botswana, South Africa, Namibia

 formerly included
see Cortaderia Crinipes Eriachne Nematopoa Pentameris Triodia

References

Chloridoideae
Poaceae genera